Piotr Bronowicki (born 10 September 1981, in Świdnik) is a Polish footballer (midfielder) playing currently for Górnik Łęczna.

Having started playing football with Górnik Łęczna, Bronowicki moved to Legia Warsaw in 2007. His brother, Grzegorz, is also a footballer.

References

1981 births
Living people
Polish footballers
Górnik Łęczna players
Legia Warsaw players
People from Świdnik
Sportspeople from Lublin Voivodeship
Association football midfielders
Piast Gliwice players